This is a gallery of national flags of Oceania.

Flags of Oceanian sovereign states

Flags of Oceanian dependencies and other territories

Flags of Oceanian sub-divisions

States of Australia

Territories of Australia

Associated states of New Zealand

Regions of New Zealand

Components of the Federated States of Micronesia

Components of French Polynesia

States of the United States

Flags of Oceanian cities 

Flags of cities with over 1 million inhabitants.

Historical flags

See also 
 Lists of flags of Oceanian countries

 List of Australian flags
 List of Fijian flags
 List of Nauruan flags
 List of New Zealand flags
 List of Palauan flags
 List of Papua New Guinean flags
 List of Samoan flags
 List of Vanuatuan flags

Notes

References 

 
Oceania
Oceania